This is a list of cities and towns in Mozambique:

Angoche
Beira
Bilene
Catandica
Chibuto
Chicualacuala
Chimoio
Chinde
Chokwé
Cuamba
Dondo
Gurúè
Inhambane
Lichinga
Manica
Maputo (Capital)
Marracuene
Matola
Maxixe
Moatize
Moçambique
Mocímboa da Praia
Mocuba
Montepuez
Mueda
Naamcha
Nacala
Nampula
Palma
Pemba
Ponta d'Ouro
Quelimane
Tete
Vilankulo
Xai-Xai
Zavala

See also
List of cities in Mozambique by population

 
Cities
Mozambique